The Gerhardt Octagonal Pig House near Gladstone, North Dakota, United States, was built in 1930.  It was listed on the National Register of Historic Places in 1986.

References

Barns on the National Register of Historic Places in North Dakota
Buildings and structures completed in 1930
Round barns in North Dakota
National Register of Historic Places in Stark County, North Dakota
1930 establishments in North Dakota
Octagonal buildings in the United States
Pig farming